Secrets and Lies may refer to:

Film and television
 Secrets & Lies (film), a 1996 film directed by Mike Leigh
 Secrets & Lies (Australian TV series), a 2014 Australian television series
 Secrets and Lies (American TV series), a 2015 American television series, based on the Australian series
 Secrets and Lies (South Korean TV series), a 2018 South Korean television series
 "Secrets and Lies" (30 Rock), a 2007 episode of 30 Rock
 "Secrets and Lies", a 2007 Desperate Housewives special recapping previous episodes
 "Secrets and Lies", a 2007 episode of The Best Years
 "Secrets & Lies", an episode from the first season of Degrassi: The Next Generation
 "Secrets and Lies", a 2002 episode of ER
 "Tigh Me Up, Tigh Me Down", originally titled "Secrets and Lies", a 2004 episode of the re-imagined Battlestar Galactica
 an Instinct episode
"Secrets & Lies", Episode 58 in H2O: Just Add Water

Books
 Secrets and Lies (book), a 1999 book by Nicky Hager
 Secrets and Lies, a 2005 book by David Southwell
 Secrets and Lies: Digital Security in a Networked World, a book by Bruce Schneier

Music
 Secret & Lies, a 2003 EP by U-ka Saegusa in dB
 Secrets and Lies (album), a 2009 album by Bertie Blackman
 Secrets & Lies (album), a 2020 album by Jakko Jakszyk